William Staples may refer to:

 William A. Staples, president of the University of Houston–Clear Lake
 William D. Staples (1868–1929), Canadian farmer, politician, and officeholder
 William R. Staples (1798–1868), justice of the Rhode Island Supreme Court (1854–56)